Kostas Skrekas (born 14 March 1973) is a Greek civil engineer and politician of the New Democracy party who has been serving as Minister of the Environment and Energy in the cabinet of Prime Minister Kyriakos Mitsotakis since 2021.

Political career 
In the May 2012 elections, Skrekas was first elected a member of the parliament, representing Trikala, making him one of the youngest MPs at the time.

From November 2014 to January 2015, Skrekas briefly served as Minister of Development and Competitiveness in the cabinet of Prime Minister Antonis Samaras.

Following the 2019 Greek legislative election, Skrekas became deputy of Minister of Rural Development and Food Makis Voridis, in charge of Common Agricultural Policy in the Mitsotakis government. After a reshuffle on 4 January 2021, he became the new Minister of Environment and Energy. In this capacity, he signed a revised  $3.1 billion contract with Canada’s Eldorado Gold in February 2021, covering the company's Skouries, Olympias and Stratoni / Mavres Petres mines and facilities in northern Greece.

References 

Living people
Place of birth missing (living people)
Government ministers of Greece
Environment ministers of Greece
New Democracy (Greece) politicians
Greek MPs 2019–2023
Politicians from Athens
Greek civil engineers
1973 births